Vedran Morović (born July 1, 1983) is a Croatian professional basketball player. He is a 1.83 m high point guard who played last for MZT Skopje.

References

External links
 Profile at Abaliga.com
 Profile at Eurolegue.net
 Profile at Basketball Reference
 Profile at Basketball-realgm.com
 Profile at Draftexpress.com

Living people
1983 births
ABA League players
BC Politekhnika-Halychyna players
Croatian expatriate basketball people in France
Croatian expatriate basketball people in the United States
Croatian men's basketball players
HKK Široki players
Junior college men's basketball players in the United States
KB Peja players
KK Cibona players
KK MZT Skopje players
KK Olimpija players
KK Zadar players
KK Zagreb players
Riesen Ludwigsburg players
Point guards
SOMB Boulogne-sur-Mer players
Basketball players from Zadar
Virtus Bologna players